Robert Pringle may refer to:

 Robert Pringle (footballer) (1897–19??), English footballer
 Sir Robert Pringle, 1st Baronet (died c. 1700) of the Pringle baronets
 Robert Pringle (politician) (died 1736), British member of parliament and Secretary at War in 1718
 Robert Abercrombie Pringle (1855–1922), Canadian lawyer and politician
 Robert Pringle (British Army officer) (1855–1925), British Army veterinary officer
 Robert Pringle (poet) (born 1940), American poet
 Robert William Pringle (1920–1996) Scottish physicist
 Robert Maxwell Pringle (born 1936), American ambassador to Mali
 Robert Keith Pringle, Scottish civil servant
 Robert C. Pringle (tug), American tugboat
 Robert Pringle, Lord Edgefield (c.1700–1764), Scottish judge
 Bob Pringle (politician) (born 1946), Canadian politician
 Bob Pringle (golfer) (1851–1902), Scottish golfer
 Bob Pringle (trade unionist) (1942–1996), Australian trade unionist